Thaumastopeus agni is a species of beetle described by Wallace in 1867. Thaumastopeus agni is included in the genus Thaumastopeus . No subspecies are listed.

References 

Cetoniinae
Beetles described in 1867